Soul (also known as Possessed) is a 2009 South Korean crime horror television drama series, starring Lim Ju-eun and Lee Seo-jin. It is about a high school girl possessed by spirits and the criminal profiler who exploits her powers in his quest for justice, played by Im and Lee respectively. It aired on MBC from August 5 to September 3, 2009 on Wednesdays and Thursdays at 21:55 for 10 episodes.

Plot
Cheerful high school girl Ha-na (Lim Ju-eun) is always the first to come out and protect her introverted twin sister Doo-na (Park Ji-yeon), who has a slight limp. After Doo-na passes away in a fire, Ha-na finds that her body no longer completely belongs to herself. Doo-na's angry spirit now lives in Ha-na, giving her special powers and monstrous strength. Genius criminal psychologist Shin Ryu (Lee Seo-jin) is an expert profiler who is determined to see justice served. When he learns about Ha-na's abilities, he uses her powers to eliminate criminals that are above the law, and to plan his revenge on the man (Kim Kap-soo) who helped his family's killer go free.

Cast
 Lee Seo-jin as Shin Ryu 
 Lim Ju-eun as Yoon Hana
 Ahn Seo-hyun as young Hana 
 Park Ji-yeon as Yoon Doo-na 
 Kim Ji-won as young Doo-na
 Park Geon-il as Jung Shi-woo 
 Lee Jin as Lee Hye-won 
 Jeon Boram as Shin So-yi 
 Kim Sung-ryung as Ha-na and Doo-na's mother
 Kim Kap-soo as Baek Do-shik 
 Yoo Yeon-seok as Baek Joong-chan 
 Lee Kyu-han as Seo Joon-hee 
 Chu Hun-yub as Kim Yoon-oh 
 Nam Da-reum as young Yoon-oh 
 Jung Da-sol as Kan Ho-sa 
 Kwak Min-suk 
 Kim Kwang-kyu as Bae Seong-bin
 Choi Soo-eun 
 Kwon Hyun-sang 
 Noh Seung-jin 
 Jo Han-chul 
 Lee Soon-sung 
 Tae Hwang 
 Choi Bum-ho

Awards and nominations

International broadcast

References

External links
 Soul official MBC website 
 
 

Korean-language television shows
2009 South Korean television series debuts
2009 South Korean television series endings
MBC TV television dramas
South Korean crime television series
South Korean horror fiction television series